Alex Leandro Souza Santos (born 28 August 1984), known simply as Alex Leandro, is a Brazilian former footballer who played as a striker. His brother-in-law, Ricardo Vilana was also a footballer, they played together at Unirea Urziceni.

Honours
Sion
Swiss Cup: 2005–06

References

External links
 

1984 births
Living people
Brazilian footballers
Association football forwards
Swiss Challenge League players
Liga I players
Liga II players
FC Bulle players
FC Sion players
FC Unirea Urziceni players
Iraklis Thessaloniki F.C. players
Chaidari F.C. players
Brazilian expatriate footballers
Expatriate footballers in Switzerland
Brazilian expatriate sportspeople in Switzerland
Expatriate footballers in Romania
Brazilian expatriate sportspeople in Romania
Expatriate footballers in Greece
Expatriate sportspeople in Greece
Brazilian expatriate sportspeople in Greece
Footballers from São Paulo